Joseph Offenbach (born Joseph Ziegler; 28 December 1904 – 15 October 1971) was a German actor. He appeared in more than one hundred films from 1942 to 1969.

Selected filmography

References

External links 
 

1904 births
1971 deaths
German male film actors
German male television actors
20th-century German male actors